Romeo T. Boisvert (November 15, 1916 – November 24, 1981) was an American politician from Maine. A prominent Democrat, Boisvert served 12 years in the Maine Senate from Androscoggin County. He also served as Mayor of his hometown of Lewiston, Maine and in the Maine House of Representatives. While in the Senate, Boisvert served at different times as both the Assistant Minority Leader and Assistant Majority Leader.

Personal
Boisvert was born on November 15, 1916, in Saint-Adrien, Quebec to Theophile and Beatrice Boisvert. The Boisvert family moved to Lewiston, Maine in 1917, where he resided for the rest of his life.

References

1916 births
1981 deaths
People from Estrie
Canadian emigrants to the United States
Mayors of Lewiston, Maine
Democratic Party members of the Maine House of Representatives
Democratic Party Maine state senators
20th-century American politicians